Ninia celata is a species of snake in the family Colubridae.  The species is native to Costa Rica and Panama.

References

Ninia
Snakes of Central America
Reptiles of Costa Rica
Reptiles of Panama
Reptiles described in 1995